The 2002 Tandridge District Council election took place on 2 May 2002 to elect members of Tandridge District Council in Surrey, England. One third of the council was up for election and the Conservative Party stayed in overall control of the council.

After the election, the composition of the council was:
Conservative 29
Liberal Democrat 10
Labour 3

Election result

Ward results

References

2002
2002 English local elections
2000s in Surrey